"Popular Monster" is a song by American rock band Falling in Reverse. It was released on November 20, 2019. The song was ranked number four in late 2019 on the US Billboard Hot Rock & Alternative Songs and number one on the US Mainstream Rock chart. As of 2022, the song has over 200 million streams on Spotify.

Promotion and release
The song was released in November 2019, and is the fourth single to be released without being an album since the release of the band's fourth studio album Coming Home. In 2020, the song was included in a DLC of the video game Rock Band 4. On October 23, 2020, Swedish duo DJs Galantis and American DJ Nghtmre released a remix version of the song. At the end of 2020, the song was ranked number one on Octane Sirius XM as the most played rock song on the radio in the United States.

Composition and lyrics
The song was composed and written by Ronnie Radke, Cody Quistad, and Tyler Smyth of DangerKids. It talks about Ronnie Radke exploring his demons, particularly that of his depression and accusations made against him throughout his life, and eventually transforming into a werewolf. Ronnie Radke says about the song:

When writing the song, Ronnie Radke drew inspiration from the 2019 film Joker.

As for the composition, Radke continues to experiment with rap, the first and second verses of the song are very noticeable rapping. However, the band does not leave aside its rock roots since the pre-chorus and the choruses continue to sound like heavy metal, even making the song lean more towards rap metal or nu metal. The song has a breakdown which marks that the band remains faithful to their metalcore sound that their fans fell in love with so much.

Music video
The music video for the song was directed by Jensen Noen. The music video depicts Ronnie Radke exploring his demons in which he eventually transforms into a werewolf. As of January 2022, the music video for the song has over 100 million views on YouTube.

Commercial performance
The song peaked at number four on the Billboard Hot Rock & Alternative Songs chart, number 15 on the Rock Airplay chart, and number one on the Mainstream Rock chart. On the Billboard Canada Rock chart, the song peaked at number 38, while in on the UK Rock & Metal Singles chart, it peaked at number 17, the song debuted at number 33 in Hungary. In June 2020, Billboard introduced two new rock charts, with "Popular Monster" becoming the first song to top the Hot Hard Rock Songs chart and peaking at number 11 on the Hot Alternative Songs chart. On December 8, 2020, the song was certified gold in the United States by the Recording Industry Association of America (RIAA) equivalent to 500,000 units. Later they obtained their first platinum record.

In popular culture
The song began to gain popularity on the TikTok video platform, several users began to use the song for their videos, this also helped the song continue to trend. The song is the entrance theme of British wrestler Zak Zodiac brother of Ronnie Radke's partner and All Elite Wrestling wrestler, Saraya (known as Paige in WWE), who works for different independent wrestling companies.

Personnel
Credits adapted from Tidal.

Falling in Reverse
 Ronnie Radke – lead vocals, programming, producer, additional guitar
 Derek Jones – rhythm guitar, backing vocals
 Tyler Burgess – bass, backing vocals
 Max Georgiev – lead guitar, backing vocals
 Johnny Mele – drums, percussion, backing vocals
Additional personnel
 Tyler Smyth – production, strings, additional writing, recording, mastering, programming, engineered
 Cody Quistad – additional writing, guitars
 Kevin Ellis Moore – cover art
 Charles Kallaghan Massabo – co-producer, programming, engineer, beat instrumental

Charts

Weekly charts

Year-end charts

Certifications

See also
 List of Billboard Mainstream Rock number-one songs of the 2020s

References

External links
 Lyrics of this song at Genius

2019 singles
2019 songs
Falling in Reverse songs
Songs written by Ronnie Radke
Rap metal songs
Metalcore songs
Heavy metal songs
Epitaph Records singles